A Family Like Many Others (Spanish: Una familia de tantas) is a 1949 Mexican drama film directed by Alejandro Galindo and starring Fernando Soler, David Silva and Martha Roth. The film's sets were designed by the art director Gunther Gerszo.

Synopsis
A domineering father's control over his family weakens when a charming salesman comes to the house.

Cast
 Fernando Soler as Rodrigo Cataño
 David Silva as Roberto del Hierro
 Martha Roth as Maru Cataño
 Carlos Riquelme as Ricardo
 Eugenia Galindo as doña Gracia Cataño
 Enriqueta Reza as Guadalupe - sirvienta
 Felipe de Alba as Héctor Cataño
 Nora Veryán as Pilar - novia de Héctor
 Isabel del Puerto as Estela Cataño
 Manuel de la Vega as Leopoldo
 Alma Delia Fuentes as Lupita Cataño
 Conchita Gentil Arcos as Invitada a fiesta
 María Gentil Arcos as Invitada a fiesta
 Maruja Grifell as Madre de Roberto
 Jorge Martínez de Hoyos as Anunciador
 Ignacio Peón as Invitado a fiesta
 Victoria Sastre

References

Bibliography
 R. Hernandez-Rodriguez. Splendors of Latin Cinema. ABC-CLIO, 2009.

External links
 

1949 films
1949 drama films
Mexican drama films
1940s Spanish-language films
Films directed by Alejandro Galindo

Mexican black-and-white films
1940s Mexican films